Obesity in Nauru is a major issue for the Republic of Nauru. 
The World Health Organization's (WHO) estimated that 94.5% of Nauruans were identified as overweight and obese, with an obesity rate of 71.7%.

Nauru is known to have the highest rates of obese inhabitants worldwide. 
Nauru has an average BMI between 34 and 35.

Causes
There are multiple factors contributing to obesity in Nauru. From the 1980s, Nauruans led a sedentary lifestyle with an unhealthy diet, contributing to "the worst health conditions in the Pacific region".

The historical food sources of Nauruans were fishing and gardening. The traditional Nauruan diet was primarily composed of marine fish, fruits, root vegetables, and coconuts. Nauru gained independence in 1968 due to an increase in economic growth from mining activities. The garnered profits were distributed amongst the citizens, leading to an outflux in citizen labor. The Government of Nauru and WHO stated that the import of western food significantly reduced the existing culture of fishing and gardening, which led to mineral depletion and economical downturn of the nation.

Approximately 90% of the land area of Nauru is covered with phosphate deposits, with the majority strip-mined and non-arable. This has led to Nauruan reliance on processed food, high in both sugar and fat, imported from large Oceanian countries such as Australia and New Zealand.

University of Queensland professor and South Pacific researcher Clive Moore stated that obesity is seen as a sign of wealth in Nauru.

Consequence
Nauru has the highest rate of adult diabetes worldwide. The International Diabetes Federation (IDF) identified 31% of Nauruans as diabetic,  with rates as high as 45% among individuals aged from 55 to 64 years. It is a small island country with the highest prevalence of type 2 diabetes in the world. 71% of the population is obese. 97% of men are overweight, which is only slightly lower than that of women.

As more and more money went to healthcare, less went to prevention, and this led to a cycle. Nauru also suffered from poor healthcare, worsening the problem. With much of the landscape destroyed from phosphate farming, Nauru was forced to import food resources from Western countries, leading to a sharp increase in consumption of processed food. With healthy food depleted from the island, obesity rates continued to climb. Due to the cultural association of obesity with wealth, many Nauruans began to view a sedentary lifestyle as preferable to one of hard work and physical exercise, further worsening the crisis.

Efforts to treat obesity
Additionally, exercise sessions and sports are regularly organised.

See also
Obesity in the Pacific

References

Nauru
Health in Nauru
Obesity in the Pacific